is a television station affiliated with the TX Network, broadcasting in Fukuoka Prefecture, Japan.

History
During the time of its establishment, the company was named as "TXN Kyushu" because the name "TV Kyushu", which the owner intended to use, was already registered as the company name of a cable TV station in Saga Prefecture. In April 2001, the name of the company was changed to the current one, though retaining its nickname.

Transmitters

Programs

Anime 
Hinako Note

Rival TV stations in Fukuoka 
 Kyushu Asahi Broadcasting (KBC, affiliated with TV Asahi and ANN) - 1
 RKB Mainichi Broadcasting (RKB, affiliated with TBS TV, Inc. and JNN) - 4
 Fukuoka Broadcasting Corporation (FBS, affiliated with NTV and NNN / NNS) - 5
 Television Nishinippon Corporation (TNC, affiliated with CX and FNN / FNS) - 8

External links
TVQ official website (Japanese)

Television stations in Japan
TX Network
Television channels and stations established in 1991
Mass media in Fukuoka
1991 establishments in Japan